Liolaemus alticolor, the brilliant tree iguana, is a species of lizard in the family  Liolaemidae. It is native to Bolivia, Chile, and Peru.

References

alticolor
Reptiles described in 1909
Reptiles of Bolivia
Reptiles of Chile
Reptiles of Peru
Taxa named by Thomas Barbour